Glaucocharis elaina is a species of moth in the family Crambidae. This species was described by Edward Meyrick in 1882. It is endemic to New Zealand.

The larvae of this species feed on mosses and liverworts.

References

Diptychophorini
Moths described in 1882
Moths of New Zealand
Endemic fauna of New Zealand
Taxa named by Edward Meyrick
Endemic moths of New Zealand